Rich in Love is a 2020 Brazilian romantic comedy film directed by Bruno Garotti and Anita Barbosa, written by Bruno Garotti and Sylvio Gonçalves and starring Danilo Mesquita, Giovanna Lancellotti and Fernanda Paes Leme. It was released on Netflix on 30 April 2020.

Plot 
Son of successful businessman Teodoro (Ernani Moraes), the Tomato King "O Rei do Tomate", Teto’s (Danilo Mesquita) life can be summed up as: the good life, money, the farm and women. Just as he’s due to inherit his father’s plantations and factories empire, Teto's life is turned upside down when he meets Paula (Giovanna Lancellotti), an independent and determined medical student.

As Teto's birthday party nears, his father tells him what his present is: a job. The traditional Festa do Tomate, with DJ Alok's special participation, is perhaps one of Teto’s last opportunities to enjoy his peaceful life in his town. And it is in this electronic and country music festival that the lives of Teto and Paula cross.

Hoping to win the heart of the girl, and also wanting to prove his worth both to his father and himself, Teto lies about who he is, hiding his roots and pretending to be of humble beginnings. This is the first of many lies that gets him into trouble in Río de Janeiro. His best friend, Igor (Jaffar Bambirra), an agricultural worker, is his assistant in this romantic and chaotic adventure that also includes the human resources consultant of Trancoso, Alana (Fernanda Paes Leme), tough Monique. (Lellê), in addition to Paula's friends Raíssa and Kátia.

Cast
 Danilo Mesquita as Teto
 Giovanna Lancellotti as Paula
 Jaffar Bambirra as Igor
 Lellê as Monique
Fernanda Paes Leme as Alana
 Ernani Moraes as Teodoro Trancoso 
 Bruna Griphao as Raissa
 Jennifer Dias as Katia
 Gillray Coutinho as Célio
 Caio Paduan as Dr. Victor
 Alok as Alok		
 Ricardo Ferreira as Taxista
 Marco Antonio de Carvalho as Brutamontes
 Oscar Calixto as Zé

References

External links
 
 

2020 films
2020 romantic comedy films
Brazilian romantic comedy films
Films about interclass romance
Films set in Rio de Janeiro (city)
Portuguese-language Netflix original films
2020s Portuguese-language films